Side project time is a type of employee benefit constituting a guarantee from employers that their employees may work on their personal projects during some part (usually a percentage) of their time at work. Side project time is limited by two stipulations: what the employee works on is the intellectual property of their employer, and if requested, an explanation must be able to be given as to how the project benefits the company in some way, even tangentially.

Technology company Google is credited for popularizing the 20% concept. It led to the development of products such as Gmail and AdSense. Though the program's continuity has been questioned Google states it remains an active program.

Other major companies that have at one time or another offered some or all of their employees the benefit include the BBC (10%), Apple (a few contiguous weeks yearly), and Atlassian (20%). Some, such as LinkedIn, have trialed more restrictive versions of such initiatives in which employees must first pitch their project and have it approved by their manager to work on it during company time.

Side project time has been criticized by some academics, such as Queens College sociology professor Abraham Walker, as "exploitative" due to how it grants employers the intellectual property rights over the personal business ideas of their employees that the employer would have never requested to be worked on otherwise.

History

3M and 15% time  
The 15% project was an initiative established by corporation 3M. At the time of this program's implementation, the United States' work force was composed of highly inflexible employment opportunities in rigid business structures. After WWII ended, 3M developed an ethos: Innovate or die, which provided enterprise for the company and inspired the launch of this program. This original project has widely successful outcomes, resulting in scientists developing and manufacturing products that remain utilized internationally, even decades later.

Google implementation 
Since before its IPO in 2004 the founders of Google have encouraged the 20% project system. Within Google, this initiative became known as the "20% Project." Employees were encouraged to spend up to twenty-percent of their paid work time pursuing personal projects. The objective of the program was to inspire innovation in participating employees and ultimately increase company potential. Google's 20% Project was influenced by a comparable program, launched in 1948, by manufacturing multinational 3M which guaranteed employees "15% time"—to dedicate up to 15 percent of their paid hours to a personal interest; it was during his side project time that Arthur Fry invented the Post-It Note. For Google's part, Gmail and AdSense both arose out of side projects.

As recognition of the clear benefits of retaining such a scheme grew, schools have replicated this system for their students in the classroom environment. The production of such creatively stimulated, ungraded work allows for peers to experiment with ideas without fear of assessment and increases their involvement in their general studies. Further, other small businesses are now using this system in their day-to-day functions, including software company Atlassian, as a safeguard to counter damp growth rates and a general lack of innovation.

In 2013, Google discontinued 20 percent time.

The 20% Project is responsible for the development of many Google services. Founders Sergey Brin and Larry Page advised that workers "spend 20% of their time working on what they think will most benefit Google". Google's email service 'Gmail' was created by the developer Paul Buchheit on his 20% time. In his project "Caribou", Buchheit used his knowledge from university software experience to create the service.  The freedom to use his time in such a way allowed him to ultimately develop a fundamental Google service. Buchheit's colleague, Susan Wojcicki, utilised her time to create their product AdSense. Finally, developer Krishna Bharat created Google News as an individual pursuit and hobby.

Other companies 
Australian enterprise company Atlassian has been using the 20% project since 2008. Co-founder Mike Cannon-Brookes stated that "innovation slows as the company grows". And as such the scheme was introduced to re-inspire innovation. The induction of the system was a six-month trial, granting $1 million to engineers and allowing them to work on private projects based on personal interests. Part of this 20% time is their annual "Ship It'"day, where employees are challenged with a task to create any product and then ship this item within 24 hours. Workers created products which ranged from refined beer to 'Jira' software updates.

American project management software company TargetProcess adopted the 20% project for their small company. The company was composed of 110 members when the initiative was introduced. Company founder Michael Dubakov identified a lack of innovation from his employees, with their daily routines occupied with monotonous work. Dubakov was inspired by the output derived from 20% projects in Google and 3M but was unsure about the limit on employee involvement. Despite driving the project at Google, only certain employees were granted this time – meaning most workers could not use this opportunity for innovation. Dubakov decided to allow all employees to pursue individual projects, to reduce boredom and inspire innovation. Initially the company introduced "Orange Fridays" in 2013, an allocated 4 hours of each Friday afternoon to attend workshops, learn about and develop new technology. From this, the company saw a rise in investment opportunities and company growth. The company developed a culture to innovate, with no pressure applied to employees moving from their regular schedule to innovate and learn.

In 2016, TargetProcess experimented with open allocation. This initiative was an extension of "Orange Fridays" and was applied to a majority of employees. The goal was to provide a more comprehensible user experience and amend issues with the TargetProcess product. Involved members were granted the opportunity to manage their schedule and individually pursue new product design. This experiment highlighted positive growth in the company, observed from a 10-month review. Dubakov implemented deadlines, ensuring each individual met their personal goals. As a result, members reported to have felt an increase in personal motivation. The main company detriment that arose from this experiment was decreased company unity. With each employee pursuing individual projects, a lack of management led to the company embodying the different visions from all employees, affecting company alignment. This experiment was ceased after the founder believed the company was unprepared for this shift in work dynamic. TargetProcess would focus on backlog creation, with training programs for product development operating in conjunction. Self-organisation was a key concern for their 20% project as not all employees could manage their projects whilst reaching regular work deadlines. Another issue identified during this experiment was the reward scheme, granted when an individual initiated a new product or scheme. This undermined the work of those employees not involved in the experiment, and led to an imbalance in motivation within the company.

Notable projects

Gmail 

From the 20% Project, Google produced forefront services that drive the company today. One outcome of this project was Gmail, Google's email service. Developer Paul Buchheit created this service under the project title 'Caribou'. This service was developed without the awareness of other employees and was publicised several years later.  By 2006, this service was available on computers and mobile devices. After 8 years of activity, Gmail had 425 million users. In May 2014, Gmail set the record as the first Android application to reach one billion installations on the Google Play store.

AdSense 

The 20% Project aided in the development of AdSense, a program where publishers can produce media advertisements for a targeted audience. This service allows website publishers to generate revenue on a per-click basis. This service was publicly released on June 18, 2003. This service was envisioned by Gmail's founder Paul Buchheit, who wanted appropriate ads to run throughout the Gmail service, but the project was pursued by Susan Wojcicki, who curated a team of developers who created the platform in their dedicated 20% time. After two years of its inception, the service was generating 15 percent of the company's revenue. The service can now offer ads in the form of simple text, flash video or rich media.

Google News 

The news aggregator Google News is another result of the 20% Project. This service was publicized in January 2006, though the beta was introduced in September 2002. The creator of this service was Krishna Bharat, who developed this software in his dedicated project time. The service sources from 20,000 different publishers, providing articles in 28 languages. Now, the service has many new features, including Google News Alerts, which emails "alerts" on chosen keyword topics.

Google Dremel 

Dremel was conceived at Google in 2006 as a "20 percent" project by Andrey Gubarev.

Atlassian 

In 2008, Atlassian announced its "20% Time Experiment", a six-month trial that was later extended to a full year. After six months of the project initiating, the company saw major improvements to Jira, Bamboo and Confluence. The Bamboo team introduced Stash 1.0 in May throughout the dedicated project time. Throughout two designated 'Innovation Week' workshops, the company shipped 12 features. At the end of the experiment, surveyed developers expressed that the biggest problem they faced was scheduling time for 20% work on top of the pressure to deliver new features and fix bugs. As a result, based on the number of developers who actually participated, the time allocated was closer to "1.1% Time." 

A related initiative is Atlassian's quarterly 24-hour "ShipIt" hackathon, which allows employees to pursue any project. In the past, employees have used this time to refine Jira Service Desk and improve the Jira software for loading screens.

TargetProcess 
TargetProcess implemented 20% Project initiatives such as the Open Allocation Experiment and Orange Fridays to inspire innovation from employees. Since the implementation of the project, investment opportunities have risen. The company grew over 10% between 2008 and 2016 during the project's operation. Founder Michael Dubakov observed increased enthusiasm from employees.

Benefits and detriments 
The 20% Project is designed to let employees experiment without the pressure of company decline or the threat of unemployment. For companies that thrive from the conception of services and products, innovative and entrepreneurial thought is vital to success.

However, for an operating business, productivity can be negatively affected by the 20% Project. The loss of time previously spent on major company-aligned projects can negatively affect a company's overall performance.

The allocation of this project time is not consistent. Former Google employee and Yahoo! CEO Marissa Mayer once stated "I've got to tell you the dirty little secret of Google's 20% time. It's really 120% time."

Chris Mims mentioned that the 20% Project was "as good as dead". This is a concern as it suggests that this project is destructive over long-term periods. In Google executive Laszlo Bock's book, Work Rules!, he mentions that the concept has "waxed and waned." He states that workers in fact dedicate 10% of their time on personal projects, increasing focus time after the idea begins to "demonstrate impact." He mentions that "the idea of 20 per cent time is more important than the reality of it." Workers should always be driven towards individual innovation, yet it should operate "somewhat outside the lines of formal management."

Atlassian Co-Founder Mike Cannon-Brookes implemented the 20% Project as a test to see if it produced any notable improvements or detriments to the company's output. They funded a six-month trial with one million Australian dollars. During this process, workers tackled inherent structural difficulties within the scheme. An employee mentioned that it was difficult to balance this 20% time "amongst all the pressures to deliver new features and bug fixes."; the program introduced more deadlines for their employees. As a result, the company found that this 20% Project in fact became 1.1% of their working time. Another issue faced was the difficulty in the organisation and team-work involved in the projects. As employees would organise groups to create new software, they would struggle to work with employees who had other commitments and alternate time schedules. The company blogs have included fewer references to the 20% Project over the last decade with references that this scheme loses effect in long-term practices. The company's 'Ship It' day still highlights the prosperity of time dedicated to employee-based innovation.

Dubakov reported that the 20% Project proved beneficial for Target Process. The benefit of this separated time is that each member feels less pressure to complete tasks, and is able to advance their skill set and to review previous work. This time was not only used for new projects but for job-related training. This allocation of time allowed for individuals to complete single tasks, improving time to delivery but negatively affecting synergy. The company reflected an emergent vision as a result of collective individual projects.

See also 
 
 List of Google products  
Genius hour

References

Google
Employment
Innovation
Workplace
Human resource management
3M
Project management
Workplace programs